This article lists important figures and events in the public affairs of British Malaya during the year 1947, together with births and deaths of prominent Malayans. As the Malayan Union, Malaya was a British colony .

Incumbent political figures

Central level
 Governor of Malaya Union :
 Edward Gent

State level
 Perlis :
Raja of Perlis : Syed Harun Putra Jamalullail 
 Johore :
Sultan of Johor : Sultan Ibrahim Al-Masyhur
 Kedah :
 Sultan of Kedah : Sultan Badlishah
 Kelantan :
Sultan of Kelantan : Sultan Ibrahim
 Terengganu :
Sultan of Terengganu : Sultan Ismail Nasiruddin Shah
 Selangor :
Sultan of Selangor : Sultan Sir Hishamuddin Alam Shah Al-Haj 
 Penang :
Monarchs : King George VI
Residents-Commissioner : Sydney Noel King
 Malacca :
Monarchs : King George VI
Residents-Commissioner : 
Edward Victor Grace Day (until unknown date)
John Falconer (from unknown date)
 Negri Sembilan :
Yang di-Pertuan Besar of Negeri Sembilan : Tuanku Abdul Rahman ibni Almarhum Tuanku Muhammad 
  Pahang :
Sultan of Pahang : Sultan Abu Bakar
 Perak :
British Adviser of Perak : Arthur Vincent Aston
Sultan of Perak : Sultan Abdul Aziz Al-Mutasim Billah Shah Ibni Almarhum Raja Muda Musa I

Events 
 1 May – Malaysia Airlines was established as Malayan Airways.
 15 June – Hin Hua High School was founded.
 9 October – An Indonesian farmer named Mat Taram bin Sa'al killed eleven people and wounded ten others on a Kuala Lumpur-bound train and a kongsi near Bangi. He was acquitted by reason of insanity.
 1 September – Marine Operation Force was established as Marine Police Force.
 Unknown date – Tunku Kurshiah College was established as Malay Girls College.
 Unknown date – Malaysian Bar was founded. E. D. Shearn was appointed as first president.

Births
 3 February – Wan A. Rafar – Poet and essay writer
 26 February – Zahari Hasib – Poet (died 2012)
 15 May – Muhyiddin Yassin – Malaysian politician and former 10th Deputy Prime Minister of Malaysia (2009-2015)
 2 June – Md Hashim bin Hussein – 18th Commander of Malaysian Armed Forces (1999-2002)
 10 August – Anwar Ibrahim – Malaysian politician and former 7th Deputy Prime Minister of Malaysia (1993-1998)
 11 August – Yahaya Ahmad – Former Chairman of DRB-HICOM (died 1997)
 24 August – Nor Mohamed Yakcop – Politician
 27 August – Zeti Akhtar Aziz – Former Governor Central Bank of Malaysia
 13 September – Abdul Ajib Ahmad – Politician and former Menteri Besar of Johor (1982-1985; died 2011)
 16 October – Patrick Teoh – Actor and radio announcer
 17 October – Zahari Affandi – Writer and journalist
 21 December - Abdul Muluk Daud – Writer
 Unknown date – Abdul Kadir Jasin – Author
 Unknown date – Chandra Muzaffar – Political analyst
 Unknown date – Samsudin Osman – Former Secretary of State

Deaths

See also
 1947 
 1946 in Malaya | 1948 in Malaya
 History of Malaysia

References 

 
1940s in Malaya
Malaya